Calista Technologies was a company that provided virtual device solutions for Windows.  The general premise behind the technology was to provide an abstract virtual view of a hosting machine's devices from within a virtual machine through drivers for Windows Vista and Windows XP, and present the user interaction to thin clients through the Remote Desktop Protocol (RDP).  The technology was included as part of the RemoteFX Technologies starting in Windows 7 Service Pack 1 and Windows Server 2008 R2 Service Pack1.

The company was co-founded by Neal Margulis, B. Anil Kumar, and Asael Dror in 2006, and raised $7 million in series A funding by Greylock Partners and Lightspeed Ventures.  The company produced a beta version of the product and had several customer trials underway at the time of the acquisition.  The product utilized both x86- and GPU-based code as well as allowing for hardware based acceleration.

Calista Technologies was acquired by Microsoft in January 2008 for approximately $115 million.

References

Defunct software companies of the United States
Software companies established in 2006
2006 establishments in the United States